Thomas Osborne may refer to:

 Thomas Osborne, 1st Duke of Leeds (1632–1712), English Lord High Treasurer, Lord President of the Council and MP for York
 Sir Thomas Osborne, 5th Baronet (1639–1715), Irish baronet and landowner
 Thomas Osborne (publisher) (1704?–1767), English publisher and bookseller
 Thomas Osborne, 4th Duke of Leeds (1713–1789), British Justice in Eyre and Cofferer of the Household
 Sir Thomas Osborne, 9th Baronet (1757–1821), Irish baronet and politician
 Thomas Burr Osborne (politician) (1798–1869), U.S. Representative from Connecticut
 Thomas Osborne (Australian journalist) (c. 1806–1853), Australian journalist and politician in the Victorian Legislative Council
 Thomas W. Osborn (1833–1898), U.S. Senator from Florida
 Thomas O. Osborn (1832–1904), American lawyer, soldier, and diplomat
 Thomas A. Osborn (1836–1898), Governor of Kansas
 Thomas Mott Osborne (1859–1926), American prison reformer
 Thomas Burr Osborne (chemist) (1859–1929), chemist, co-discoverer of Vitamin A
 Tom Osborne (born 1937), US college football head coach and member of Congress
 Tom Osborne (Canadian politician) (born 1964), Newfoundland and Labrador politician
 Tom Osborne (American football coach) (born 1960)
 Thomas E. Osborne, American engineer, created the Green Machine which led to the Hewlett-Packard 9100A